Daniel Becke (born 12 March 1978, in Erfurt), is a former road bicycle and track cyclist from Germany, who was born in the former East Germany. He won a gold medal in the team pursuit at the 2000 Summer Olympics in Sydney. He was decorated on Febr. 2. 2001 by the President of the Federal Republic of Germany (in German: Präsident der Bundesrepublik Deutschland) for winning the gold medal during the Olympic Games 2000. He retired in 2008.

References

External links
 
 

1978 births
Living people
German male cyclists
Cyclists at the 2000 Summer Olympics
Olympic cyclists of Germany
Recipients of the Silver Laurel Leaf
Olympic gold medalists for Germany
Olympic medalists in cycling
Sportspeople from Erfurt
UCI Track Cycling World Champions (men)
Medalists at the 2000 Summer Olympics
German track cyclists
People from Bezirk Erfurt
Cyclists from Thuringia